András Domahidy (23 February 1920 – 8 August 2012) was a contemporary Hungarian-Australian, novelist and librarian. His novels were written in Hungarian.

Born in Satu Mare, in northwestern  Romania, András Domahidy completed a PhD in Law at Budapest University and served in the Royal Hungarian Army towards the close of World War II. In 1950 he emigrated to Australia, settling in Perth and obtaining a BA at the University of Western Australia. Until his retirement in 1985 he was a senior librarian at the university.

Domahidy started writing in the 1950s and his novels Vénasszonyok nyara (Indian Summer, 1969) and Árnyak és asszonyok (Shadows and Women, 1979) were published in Europe. Shadows and Women has since been published in English translation in Australia.

Bibliography 

Novels
 Vénasszonyok nyara [Indian Summer] (Rome, 1969; Budapest, 1987)
 Árnyak és asszonyok (Bern, 1979; Budapest, 1985) [Shadows and Women Translated by Elizabeth Windsor (Perth: Aeolian, 1989) ]

External links 
 Aeolian Press

References 

1920 births
20th-century Australian novelists
20th-century Australian male writers
Australian male novelists
Hungarian male novelists
2012 deaths
People from Satu Mare
People from Perth, Western Australia
University of Western Australia alumni
20th-century Hungarian novelists
20th-century Hungarian male writers
Romanian emigrants to Hungary
Hungarian emigrants to Australia